Holding My Own is the twelfth studio album by American country music singer George Strait.  It was released by MCA Records and features the singles "Gone as a Girl Can Get" and "So Much Like My Dad", both of which charted in the Top 5 on the country charts, but it became his first album since 1981’s “Strait Country” not to produce a number one hit. "Trains Make Me Lonesome" was previously recorded by the trio Schuyler, Knobloch, & Overstreet on their 1986 self-titled debut album, and then in 1988 by Marty Haggard.

Track listing

Personnel
The following musicians performed on this album:

Ace in the Hole Band (Tracks 3 and 9)
David Anthony – acoustic guitar
Mike Daily – steel guitar
Gene Elders – fiddle
Benny MacArthur – electric guitar
Terry Hale – bass guitar
Ronnie Huckaby – piano
Mike Kennedy – drums
Rick McRae – electric guitar

All other tracks
Joe Chemay – bass guitar
Floyd Domino – piano
Buddy Emmons – steel guitar
Steve Gibson – acoustic guitar
Johnny Gimble – fiddle
Jim Horn – saxophone, alto flute
Larrie Londin – drums
Liana Manis – background vocals
George Strait – lead vocals
Curtis Young – background vocals
Reggie Young – electric guitar

Technical
Jimmy Bowen – producer
 Bob Bullock – recording
Steve Tillisch – mixing

Chart positions

References

1992 albums
George Strait albums
MCA Records albums
Albums produced by Jimmy Bowen